Pellegrino II (died 1204) was Patriarch of Aquileia in northern Italy from 1195 to 1204.

Origins

Pellegrino was born in Cividale del Friuli to the Ortenburg-Sponheim family, son of Engelbert III, Margrave of Istria (1124-1173). 
His nephew was Ulrich II, Duke of Carinthia (1181-1202).
He became prior of Cividale, then archdeacon of Aquileia.
Pellegrino succeeded Godfrey as Patriarch of Aquileia in 1195.

Patriarch

During Pellegrino's patriarchy there were constant wars against Gorizia, Treviso and Ezzelino II da Romano.
Pellegrino remained neutral when war broke out in 1198 between the Ghibelline Philip of Swabia, King of Germany and son of Frederick I, Holy Roman Emperor, and the Guelph rebel Otto, Duke of Brunswick.
He continued his war against Treviso, laying siege to Pordenone, but was defeated in 1201 by the League at Tagliamento.
Pellegrino was forced to seek an alliance with Venice.
As part of the price, at a conference in San Quirino at Cormons in 1202 the counts of Gorizia were given full independence of Aquileia.

Towards the end of his reign Pellegrino dedicated a silver relief Altarpiece of Pellegrino II that today adorns the main altar of the church of Santa Maria Assunta in Cividale.
It is unusual in showing an early example of typography, where letters were punched into the metal.

Pellegrino was succeeded by Wolfger von Erla in 1204.

References
Citations

Sources

1204 deaths
Pellegrino II
Pellegrino II
Austrian people of German descent
Year of birth unknown